Nelson Cabrera may refer to:

 Nelson Cabrera (Uruguayan footballer) (born 1967), former Uruguayan footballer
 Nelson David Cabrera (born 1983), Bolivian football defender